Zenith BJJ is a Brazilian jiu-jitsu association and team started in 2013 by black belt World champions Robert Drysdale and Rodrigo Cavaca. While Drysdale runs Zenith Las Vegas and Cavaca Zenith Santos in Brazil, more than 200 Zenith team associated academies exist worldwide, spread across the US, Canada, Central America, South America, Europe and Australia.

History 
Zenith BJJ was established in 2013 after Rodrigo Cavaca left the Checkmat team  to start a new team alongside his friend Robert Drysdale.

The Zenith BJJ main academy and headquarters is located in Las Vegas, Nevada.
Zenith BJJ was one of the top 10 teams of the women's division at the 2021 World Jiu-Jitsu Championship.

Notable members
A list of current and former members:
 Robert Drysdale
 Rodrigo Cavaca
 Amy Campo
 Paulo Rezende
 Marcelo Nunes
 Fellipe Andrew
 Adam Zielinski
 Paulo Silva
 Lukasz Michalec
 Nicklas Hartman
 Warren Weingartner
 Emilio Rodriguez

See also
 Brazilian Jiu-Jitsu
 Grappling

References 

Brazilian jiu-jitsu organizations
2013 establishments